The following is a list of locomotives produced by GE Transportation Systems, a subsidiary of Wabtec. All were/are built at Fort Worth, Texas or Erie, Pennsylvania, in the United States. Most (except the electrics, the switchers, the AC6000CW, and the Evolution series) are powered by various versions of GE's own FDL diesel prime mover, based on a Cooper Bessemer design and manufactured at Grove City, Pennsylvania. GE is one of the largest locomotive manufacturing companies. This list includes locomotives built solely for export outside of North America.

Freight locomotives

Early locomotives, switchers and special purpose

Switchers
{|class="wikitable sortable" style="width: 100%"
!Model designation!!Build year!!Total produced!!class="unsortable"|AAR wheel arrangement!!Prime mover!!|Power output!!class="unsortable"|Image
|- align = "center"
| 20-ton Boxcab||1938 ||5 || B || Cummins ||  ||
|- align = "center"
| 23-ton Boxcab||1939 ||6 || B || Cummins ||  ||
|- align = "center"
| 23-ton||1941 ||29 || B || Cummins ||  || 
|- align = "center"
| 25-ton ||1941–1974 ||510 || B || Cummins ||  ||
|- align = "center"
| 35-ton|| || ||B || || ||
|- align = "center"
| 43-ton|| || ||B-B || || ||
|- align = "center"
| 44-ton || 1940–1956 || 386 ||B-B || Caterpillar D17000 × 2 (most)Hercules DFXD × 2 (11)Buda 6DH1742 × 2 (10)Caterpillar D342 × 2 (last 4) ||  || 
|- align = "center"
| 45-ton || 1940–1956  || ||B-B || Cummins × 2 ||  hp || 
|- align = "center"
| GE 45-Ton switcher "Drop Cab"||1944–1949||103|| B-B || || ||
|- align = "center"
| GE 45-Ton switcher "Off-Center Cab"||1941||9|| B-B ||Cooper Bessemer EN6 || ||
|- align = "center"
| GE 46-Ton switcher "Drop Cab"||1955||3|| B-B || || ||
|- align = "center"
| 47-ton "Drop Cab"||1943–1953 ||58 ||B-B || || ||
|- align = "center"
| 50-ton|| || ||B-B || || || 
|- align = "center"
| GE 55-Ton switcher "Off-Center Cab"||1931|| 7 || B-B || Ingersoll Rand 300 || ||
|- align = "center"
| GE 57-Ton switcher "Off-Center Cab"||1935|| 1|| B-B || Cooper Bessemer ENL6 || ||
|- align = "center"
| 60-ton "Boxcab" ||1928–1930 || 2 ||B-B || Ingersoll Rand 300   || ||
|- align = "center"
| 60-ton "Off-Center Cab"||1935–1941 || 10 ||B-B || Ingersoll Rand 300 (1) Ingersoll Rand 400 (2) Cooper Bessemer EN8 (3) Cooper Bessemer ENL8 (4)   || ||
|- align = "center"
| GE 61-Ton switcher "Off-Center Cab"||1937|| 1|| B-B || Cooper Bessemer EN6 || ||
|- align = "center"
| 65-ton || || ||B-B || || || 
|- align = "center"
| GE 68-Ton switcher "Off-Center Cab"||1939|| 2 || B-B || Cooper Bessemer GN6 || ||
|- align = "center"
| 70-ton || 1947–1955 || 238 ||B-B || Cooper-Bessemer FWL-6T ||500-660 HP || 
|- align = "center"
| 75-ton Drop Cab|| 1944 || 10 ||Bo'Bo' || 2 Cummins L1 600 || || 
|- align = "center"
| GE 78-ton||1953||10||B-B ||ALCO 6-251A||   ||Consolidated Railroads of Cuba
|- align = "center"
| 80-ton || || ||B-B || 2 X Cummins || 470 HP X 2  ||
|- align = "center"
| 95-ton|| || ||B-B || || ||
|- align = "center"
| 100-ton "Boxcab" ||1928–1930 || 11 ||B-B || Ingersoll Rand 300(x2)  || ||
|- align = "center"
| 100-ton||1933–1935 || 7 ||B-B || Ingersoll Rand 300(x2)  || ||
|- align = "center"
| 110-ton || || ||B-B || || ||
|- align = "center"
| 125-ton|| || ||B-B || || ||
|- align = "center"
| 126-ton|| || ||B-B || || ||
|- align = "center"
| 128-ton|| || ||B-B || || ||
|- align = "center"
| 600-hp center-cab || 1933–1935 || 7 ||B-B || Ingersoll-Rand 10×12 ||  ||
|- align = "center"
| NH class DEY-2 || 1936–1937 || 10 ||B-B || Cooper-Bessemer 10½×12 GN8 (5)Ingersoll-Rand 10×12 600 (5) ||  ||
|- align = "center"
| 1000-hp center-cab || 1937–1940 || 9 ||B-B || Cooper-Bessemer GN-6||  ||
|- align = "center"
| SG10B|| 1975–1981 ||124||B-B ||7FDL-8||  ||
|}

General purpose
{|class="wikitable sortable" style="width: 100%"
!Model designation!!Build year!!Total produced!!AAR wheel arrangement!!Prime mover!!|Power output!!class="unsortable"|Image
|- align = "center"
|57-ton gas-electric boxcab ||1913 || 1 ||B-B ||2 xGM-16C4 V-8 || || 
|- align = "center"
| 60-ton demonstrator|| || ||B-B || Ingersoll-Rand ||   ||
|- align = "center"
| 60-ton boxcab || || ||B-B || Ingersoll-Rand ||   ||
|- align = "center"
| 100-ton boxcab || || ||B-B || 2x Ingersoll-Rand ||   ||
|- align = "center"
| EN-6|| || ||B-B || || ||
|- align = "center"
| 1800-hp transfer|| 1936 || 1 ||C-C || 2x Ingersoll-Rand  ||   ||
|- align = "center"
| 2000-hp transfer|| 1936 || 1 ||C-C ||  Busch-Sulzer ||   ||
|- align = "center"
| UM20B|| 1954 || 2 ( 1 ea cab and booster) ||B-B || CB 8 cyl ||   ||
|- align = "center"
| UM20B|| 1954 || 2 ( 1 ea cab and booster) ||B-B || CB 12 cyl ||   ||
|- align = "center"
| GE GEX3341|| 1954–1966 || 11 White Pass and Yukon Route || C-C || ALCO 6-251 ||  || 
|}

Universal Series (1956 to 1998)

Four axle

Six axle

Six axle & Pony

Eight axle

Dash 7 Series (introduced 1977)

Models with "A" suffix are equipped with 12-cylinder prime mover in place of the standard 16-cylinder version, with the same power output.

Four axle

Six axle

Dash 8 Series (introduced 1982)

GE originally introduced this series with the model designation following the pattern of the Dash-7 line. After product improvements were made to the line in 1987 the official designations for models in this series changed to "Dash-8...", as shown in the list below. However, for simplicity, many railroads decided to use designations which follow the pattern of the Dash-7 line. Thus, for example, the Dash 8-40C is usually rendered as "C40-8". The "W" suffix indicates the then-optional wide-nose "North American" safety cab. For example, the Santa Fe used the designation "B40-8W" for GE's "Dash 8-40BW".  The railroad continued this practice until its merger with the Burlington Northern Railroad in 1995, and the new railroad, Burlington Northern-Santa Fe (later BNSF Railway) furthered the practice.

Introduced during the Dash 8's later years were split-cooling in the radiators and electronic displays for the crews (instead of analogue gauges).

Four axle

Six axle

Eight axle

Dash 9 Series (introduced 1993)

The Dash 9 series introduced primarily electronics updates to the Dash 8 line. Also introduced was the HiAd (High-Adhesion) truck. Split-cooling was standard.

Four axle
No four axle freight versions produced

Six axle

Eight axle

AC Series (introduced 1994)
These feature the same carbody design and many of the internal components as the Dash-9 series, except they are equipped with AC traction motors instead of the conventional DC versions. The cab air conditioner was moved from the left (conductor's) side walkway to a position under the cab floor to make space for the six traction inverters (one per axle) that supply the AC current to the traction motors.

Six axle

*Note: two versions: one contained a 16-cylinder 7HDL, co-developed by GE and the German firm Deutz-MWM, rated at 6000 HP; the other a 16-cylinder 7FDL rated at 4390 HP. The units equipped with the 7FDL were a sub-version AC6000 "Convertible" and were produced to get the type into operation while the 7HDL was developed.

**Note 1: The "AC44i" is a export version of the AC4400CW locomotive for Brazil. In that country, these models are the first to use AC (Alternating Current) in their operating systems. The first units were made in United States on 2008, and the other sequential units made in the local plant of GE, in Contagem municipality, Minas Gerais.

Evolution Series (introduced 2005) 

The Evolution Series locomotives replaced the Dash 9 and AC series in North America and exceeded the then new U.S. EPA Tier II emissions standards that took effect in 2005, reducing nitrogen oxides emissions by over 40% and improving fuel consumption as well.  They use the new GEVO engine (based in part on the 7HDL design) which produces the same power from twelve cylinders as previous locomotives' 16-cylinder 7FDL engine.  Both AC and DC Evolution Series share the same carbody design. The radiator section "wings" are divided into two parts with differing angles.

Six axle

Eight axle 

*Note: GE Brazil has an order for 46 units of this model for Rumo Logística, which will be delivered during the year 2017. Is the most powerful narrow gauge  locomotive in the world.

FLXDrive 

The FLXDrive Series of locomotives are GE's first battery-electric locomotives, using a similar design to the Evolution Series, with the exception of a diesel prime mover. The FLXDrive series was introduced in late 2019 with one BEL44C4D demonstrator unit, but other FLXDrive variants are planned for the future.

Six axle

PowerHaul Series

Six axle

Passenger locomotives

While primarily a builder of freight locomotives, GE has on occasion been called upon to construct passenger models for specific customers. The most recent is the P42DC, ordered by Amtrak to replace the aging EMD F40PH. Additional units have been built for Via Rail Canada.

Electric locomotives
{|class="wikitable sortable" style="width: 100%"
!Model designation!!Build year!!Total produced!!AAR wheel arrangement!!Supply Voltage!!|Power output!!class="unsortable"|Image
|- align = "center"
| NYC T-1later reclassedas S-1 || 1904 || 1 New York Central Railroad || 1-D-1rebuilt to2-D-2 || 600 V DC ||   || 
|- align = "center"
| NYC T-2later reclassedas S-2 || 1906 || 34 New York Central Railroad || 1-D-1rebuilt to2-D-2 || 600 V DC  ||  || 
|- align = "center"
| NYC S-3 || 1908–1909 || 12 New York Central Railroad ||2-D-2 || 600 V DC  ||  ||
|- align = "center"
| GN boxcab || 1909 || 4 Great Northern Railway || B+B || 6,000 V,3 phase AC ||  || 
|- align = "center"
| NH 068 || 1912 || 1 New York, New Haven and Hartford Railroad || 2-B+B-2 || 11,000 V AC,25 Hz ||  ||
|- align = "center"
| NYC T-1b || 1913 || 10 New York Central Railroad || B+B-B+B || 600 V DC ||  ||
|- align = "center"
| NYC T-2a || 1914 || 16 New York Central Railroad || B+B-B+B || 600 V DC ||  ||
|- align = "center"
| Canadian National Class Z-1-a || 1914–16|| 6 Canadian Northern Railway(later Canadian National Railway) || B+B || 2400 V DC ||  || 
|- align = "center"
| Milwaukee Road class EP-1, EF-1, EF-2, EF-3, and EF-5|MILW EF-1 / EP-1 (GE's self-proclaimed "King of the Rails")|| 1915–1917 || 42 Milwaukee Road || 2-B+B+B+B-2 || 3000 V DC ||  || 
|- align = "center"
| MILW ES-1 || 1915 || 1 Milwaukee Road || B-B || 1500 V DC ||  || 
|- align = "center"
| MILW ES-2 || 1916, 1919 || 4 Milwaukee Road || B-B || 3000 V DC ||    || 
|- align = "center"
| MILW EP-2(“Bi-polar”) || 1919 || 5 Milwaukee Road || 1B+D+D+B1 || 3000 V DC ||  || 
|- align = "center"
|NRT S104/105
|1920
|2 Northwestern Elevated Railroad
|B-B
|600 V DC
|
|
|- align = "center"
| Mexican Railway Boxcabs || 1923 || 10 Mexican Railway || B+B+B || 3000 V DC ||  ||
|- align = "center"
|  || 1923 || 2 Japanese National Railways || B-B || 1500 V DC ||  || 
|- align = "center"
|  || 1926 || 4 Japanese National Railways || B-B || 1500 V DC ||  || 
|- align = "center"
| New York Central R-Motor || 1926 || 2 New York Central Railroad || B-B+B-B || 600 V DC ||  ||
|- align = "center"
| NYC Q || 1926 || New York Central Railroad || B-B || 600 V DC ||  ||
|- align = "center"
| NYC T-3 || 1926 || 10 New York Central Railroad || B+B-B+B || 600 V DC ||  || 
|- align = "center"
| NH EF2 || 1926 || 5 New York, New Haven and Hartford Railroad || 1-B+B-1 ||  ||  ||
|- align = "center"
| NH EY3 || 1926 || 2 New York, New Haven and Hartford Railroad || B+B || 11,000 V AC,25 Hz ||  ||
|- align = "center"
| GN Y-1(PRR FF2) || 1927–1930 || 8 Great Northern Railway(sold to Pennsylvania Railroad) || 1-C+C-1 || 11,000 V AC,25 Hz ||  || 
|- align = "center"
| CUT P1-a || 1929–1930 || 22 Cleveland Union Terminalto New York Central Railroad and rebuilt to class P-2 || 2-C+C-2 || 3000 V DCrebuilt 600 V DC ||  || 
|- align = "center"
| GE three-power boxcab || 1930 || 40 New York Central Railroad 1 Chicago, Rock Island and Pacific Railroad || B-B || All: 600 V DC Battery 34: 600 V DC 3rd Rail  2: 3000 V DC Overhead Lines||   || 
|- align = "center"
| NYC R-2 || 1930–1931 || 42 New York Central Railroad || C-C || 600 V DC ||  || 
|- align = "center"
| NH EP3 || 1931 || 10 New York, New Haven and Hartford Railroad ||2-C+C-2 ||11,000 V AC,25 Hz /600 V DC ||  || 
|- align = "center"
| PRR P5a || 1932 || 25 Pennsylvania Railroad(+13 by PRR, +54 by Westinghouse) || 2-C-2 || 11,000 V AC,25 Hz ||  || 
|- align = "center"
| PRR GG1 || 1934–1935(PRR: 1935–43) || 15 Pennsylvania Railroad(+124 by PRR) ||2-C+C-2 ||11,000 V AC,25 Hz ||  || 
|- align = "center"
| NH EP4 || 1938 || 6 New York, New Haven and Hartford Railroad ||2-C+C-2 ||11,000 V AC,25 Hz /600 V DC  ||  || 
|- align = "center"
| NH EF3a || 1942 || 5 New York, New Haven and Hartford Railroad ||2-C+C-2 ||11,000 V AC,25 Hz ||  || 
|- align = "center"
|  || 1940–48 || 22 Paulista Railway15 Estrada de Ferro Central do Brasil || 2-C+C-2 || 3000 V DC ||  ||  
|- align = "center"
| 2-D+D-2("Little Joe")|| 1946 || 20 Soviet Railways (not delivered –5 Paulista Railway3 South Shore Line12 Milwaukee Road) || 2-D+D-2 || 3,300 V DCAs rebuilt by CSS&SB:1,500 V DC ||  || 
|- align = "center"
| GN W-1 || 1947 || 2 Great Northern Railway || B-D+D-B || 11,000 V AC,25 Hz || ||
|- align = "center"
| VGN EL-2B|| 1948 || 4 sets (2 units each) Virginian Railway || (B+B-B+B)+(B+B-B+B) || 11,000 V AC, 25 Hz || per set ||
|- align = "center"
| CN Centercab Electric || 1950 || 3 Canadian National Railway || B-B || 2400 V DC ||  ||
|- align = "center"
| PRR E2b || 1951 || 6 Pennsylvania Railroad || B-B || 11,000 V AC,25 Hz ||  ||
|- align = "center"
| NH EP5(PC E40)|| 1954 || 10 New York, New Haven and Hartford Railroad || C-C || 11,000 V AC,25 Hz /600 V DC  ||  ||
|- align = "center"
| VGN EL-C(PC E33) || 1956–57 || 12 Virginian Railway || C-C || 11,000 V AC, 25 Hz ||  || 
|- align = "center"
| PRR E44 || 1960–63 || 44 Pennsylvania Railroad || C-C ||11,000 V AC,25 Hz  ||  ||
|- align = "center"
| PRR E44a || 1960–63 || 22 Pennsylvania Railroad || C-C ||11,000 V AC,25 Hz  ||  ||
|- align = "center"
| E50C || 1968 || 2 Muskingum Electric Railroad || C-C || 25,000 V AC,60 Hz ||  ||
|- align = "center"
| E60C || 1972–76 || 6 Black Mesa and Lake Powell Railroad || C-C || 50,000 V AC, 60 Hz(overhead) ||  || 
|- align = "center"
| E60CH / E60CP || 1974–76 || 26 Amtrak || C-C || 11,000 V AC, 25 Hz11,000–13,500 V AC 60 Hz(overhead) ||  || 
|- align = "center"
| E25B || 1976 || 7 Texas Utilities || B-B || 25,000 V AC,60 Hz ||  ||
|- align = "center"
|  || 1977–81, 1992 || 97 Taiwan Railway Administration || C-C || 25,000 V AC, 60 Hz(overhead) ||  || 
|- align = "center"
| E60C-2 || 1982–83 || 39 Ferrocarriles Nacionales de México2 Deseret Western Railway || C-C || 25 kV AC, 60 Hz (NdM)50 kV AC, 60 Hz (DW)(overhead) ||  || 
|}

Turbine locomotives

Indonesian locomotives 

Locomotives exported to Indonesia are quite different from other locomotives produced by GE. They use the same type of engine across all models (GE 7FDL-8, except for UM 106T Locomotives which used Alco 12-244E).
Despite using the same type of engine, the power capabilities from type to type are different as some models are equipped with dual turbocharger, or equipped with common rail system and dual turbocharger.

References

Notes

Bibliography

External links

 GE Transportation – official site

GE Electric trains

 
GE